Loos & Co., Inc. is a privately owned manufacturing company located in Pomfret, Connecticut. Their focus is in aircraft cable, wire rope, plastic coated steel cable, cable assemblies and stainless steel wire products

History 
Founded in 1958 by August "Gus" Loos, Loos and Co., Inc. began its operations as a manufacturer's representative for overseas hardware concerns. This included importing aircraft cable and wire rope from Europe and Japan as well as distributing tools and fittings.

In 1962, Loos & Co. began to manufacture cable assemblies. In 1964, facilities were expanded to produce plastic-coated cables. By 1971, the company acquired the necessary equipment and began manufacturing wire rope and cable. In 1974, they, became qualified to produce aircraft cable to US Government specifications.

Over the following decades, the company diversified its offerings into the consumer products market. Using the same aircraft quality cables, Loos produced bicycle locks, sporting goods, and other consumer products. In the early 1990s, with increasing price competition from foreign markets, the company increased efforts in niche markets rather than in consumer goods..

Today, Loos & Co. manufactures a wide variety of wire, aircraft cable, and wire rope.  These products are used in aerospace, military, and commercial applications, including - Aircraft flight controls, elevators, fitness equipment, rigging, and scaffolding operations. They are OEM producers of companies such as Boeing, General Dynamics, and Bombardier.

Medical Market 

Loos & Co. has now expanded their product line into the medical industry. These products will now include  medical wire, medical cable, and medical cable assemblies made in a variety of stainless steel alloys.

Charity 

Loos & Co. has made contributions to organizations within their community and industry. In honor of wire rope pioneer John A. Roebling, Loos & Co. manufactured and donated a stainless steel replica of the iron rope Roebling manufactured for the Allegheny Portage Railroad. Loos & Co. has donated materials to the organization Connecticut Corsair who are restoring a Vought F4U Corsair, a fighter originally manufactured in Connecticut.  In the Spring of 2012, Loos & Co. donated wire products to the Hole in the Wall Gang Camp, a summer camp founded by Paul Newman and described as "a community dedicated to providing a different kind of healing to seriously ill children."

References

External links 
 Loos & Co. Official Website

Manufacturing companies based in Connecticut
Pomfret, Connecticut